The Tuzla Film Festival is an annual film festival that takes places in Tuzla, Bosnia and Herzegovina.

Focus
The Tuzla Film Festival is organized by Magic Factory, with the aim of promoting South Slavic cinematography.

History
Organizational efforts for the first festival began in 2010, requiring two full years because of lack of financial and human resources. The first festival occurred on August 22, 2012, at the Bosnian Cultural Center in Tuzla. In attendance were actors, directors, producers and business people from the former Yugoslavia.

The second festival featured a casting call for the film Atomski s desna directed by Srđan Dragojević, in which two local children (Ensar Hamzić and Danis Aljić) became the first children of Tuzla to be cast in a feature film.

The third annual festival introduced an international film competition.

Categories
Tuzla Film Festival includes the following categories: 
 feature film
 documentary
 short
 animated movie

In addition, the Tuzla Film Festival has two special categories: 
 "Shoot with anything"
 "Future generation short films"

These categories aim to encourage participation of young filmmakers.

Awards
The main award at the festival is called Vila TFF

Vila TFF for the best feature movie

Vila TFF for the best short movie

Vila TFF for the best documentary movie

Vila TFF for the best animated movie

Vila TFF for the best film in "Future Generation Short Films" category

Notable guests
People who visited the festival include:
 Lazar Ristovski
 Enis Bešlagić
 Emir Hadžihafizbegović
 Nikola Kojo
 Zlatan Zuhrić
 Jelena Perčin
 Slaven Knezović
 Srđan Dragojević
 Robert Kurbaša
 Asim Ugljen
 Zijad Gračić
 Ademir Kenović
 Hrvoje Barišić
 Miloš Samolov
 Miroslav Momčilović
 Mira Banjac
 Milutin Karadžić
 Filip Juričić
 Zijah Sokolović
 Momčilo Otašević
 Adnan Hasković

References

External links
Tuzla Film Festival Official Website
NGO "Magic Factory" Official Website
Tuzla
Film festivals in Bosnia and Herzegovina
Annual events in Bosnia and Herzegovina